Come as You Were is the third studio album by American country music artist T. Graham Brown. It was released in 1988 via Capitol Nashville. The includes the singles "Darlene", "Come as You Were" and "Never Say Never".

Track listing

Chart performance

References

1988 albums
T. Graham Brown albums
Albums produced by Ron Chancey
Capitol Records Nashville albums